The men’s team sprint competition in cross-country skiing at the 2022 Winter Olympics was held on 16 February, at the Kuyangshu Nordic Center and Biathlon Center in Zhangjiakou. Erik Valnes and Johannes Høsflot Klæbo of Norway won the event. Iivo Niskanen and Joni Mäki of Finland won the silver medal, and Alexander Bolshunov and Alexander Terentyev, representing the Russian Olympic Committee, bronze.

Summary
The defending champions are Martin Johnsrud Sundby and Johannes Høsflot Klæbo, with Klaebo qualifying for these games. The silver medalists, Alexander Bolshunov and Denis Spitsov, as well as the bronze medalists, Maurice Manificat and Richard Jouve, qualified as well. The overall leader of the 2021–22 FIS Cross-Country World Cup before the Olympics, as well as the sprint leader, was Klæbo. Thomas Helland Larsen and Even Northug won the only team sprint event of the season. Erik Valnes and Klæbo are the 2021 World Champions in team sprint. The Russian duo of Bolshunov and Alexander Terentyev are also highly touted.

In the final, the first four legs all teams skied together, with only Austria being behind and out of medal contention. At the fifth interchange, Norway, Finland and the Russian Olympic Committee teams were separated by less than a second, and the fourth team, Sweden, were 8 seconds behind. Norway's Valnes, ROC's Bolshunov and Finland's Iivo Niskanen, the 15 km classical champion from these Olympics, gave their respective teammates a head start into the final leg. Unsurpisingly, these three teams became the medalists. Klæbo, who earlier became the individual sprint champion at these Olympics ahead of Terentyev and Joni Mäki, who were third and fourth in that competition, was the fastest of the three, and Norway won gold. Behind him, Mäki edged ahead of Terentyev to claim the silver medal for Finland.

Qualification

Results

Semifinals

Final

References

Men's cross-country skiing at the 2022 Winter Olympics